Mustapha Raifak (born 9 September 1975 in Montreuil) is a French high jumper.

He finished seventh at the 2006 World Cup. He also competed at the 1997 World Championships and the 2006 World Indoor Championships without reaching the final round.

His personal best jump is 2.28 metres, achieved in July 1997 in Toulouse.

Competition record

References

1975 births
Living people
French male high jumpers
Sportspeople from Montreuil, Seine-Saint-Denis
Athletes (track and field) at the 2001 Mediterranean Games
Mediterranean Games competitors for France
20th-century French people